A person who's been appointed to a position by a company or organisation but doesn't have a contract or receive regular payment may be an office-holder.
This includes: statutory appointments, such as registered company directors or secretaries, board members of statutory bodies, or crown appointments

An office-holder is a person who has a specific political or business-related position, such as:
An incumbent politician
An employee
 Other official